The flag of the U.S. state of Nevada consists of a cobalt blue field with a variant of the state's emblem in the upper left-hand corner. The emblem contains a silver star (a reference to the state's nickname, the Silver State), below which appears the state's name. Above the star is a golden-yellow scroll with the words "Battle Born", one of the state's mottos (in reference to Nevada becoming a state during the American Civil War). Below the star and state name are two sprays of green sagebrush (the state flower) with yellow flowers.

History

The first flag of Nevada was created by Governor John Sparks and Col. Harry Day in 1905. It was based strongly on Nevada's natural resources of gold and silver. The blue of the flag was based directly on the color of the flag of the United States.

The current flag had its origin in a design contest announced in 1926. The winning design, by Louis Shellback III, was subjected to some revision in the state legislature, where there was disagreement between the two houses over the placement of the word "Nevada" on the flag. A compromise was reached, and in 1929 Governor Fred B. Balzar signed into law a bill adopting the new flag. In 1989, however, a legislative researcher discovered that the bill as sent to and signed by the governor did not accurately reflect the 1929 legislative agreement. The flag used from 1929 until it was revised in 1991 displayed the letters of the word "Nevada" in a complete circle around the flag's single star, with the "N" of Nevada at the uppermost tip of the star indicating its "northern" position in the civil war, and with each of the other letters of the word Nevada located in the spaces between the remaining points of the star, displaying near each junction of the star's pentagonal center.  Thus, "Nevada" was spelt from the "N" at the top, radiating clockwise E, V, A, D, A, in the spaces between the star's points.  A law enacted in 1991 directed that the word "Nevada" appear below the star and above the sagebrush sprays, thus producing the current design.

See also

Flags of governors of the U.S. states
State of Nevada
Symbols of the state of Nevada
Great Seal of the State of Nevada

References

External links
Nevada State Archivist's account of the history of the flag

United States state flags
Flag
Flags introduced in 1929
Flags of Nevada